Andrew Elias Pratt (born August 27, 1979) is a former Major League Baseball pitcher who played for the Atlanta Braves and Chicago Cubs. Pratt was selected by the Texas Rangers in the 9th round of the 1998 Major League Baseball Draft and had a career ERA of 15.00 in 5 career appearances with the Braves and Cubs. He also played in the Texas Rangers organization from – and Milwaukee Brewers organization from –. After his release from the Brewers organization in 2006, Pratt played the rest of the season for the Somerset Patriots of the independent Atlantic League. He has not played professionally since.

External links

1979 births
Living people
Major League Baseball pitchers
Baseball players from Arizona
Sportspeople from Mesa, Arizona
Gulf Coast Rangers players
Charlotte Rangers players
Savannah Sand Gnats players
Tulsa Drillers players
Greenville Braves players
Richmond Braves players
Atlanta Braves players
Arizona League Cubs players
Lansing Lugnuts players
West Tennessee Diamond Jaxx players
Iowa Cubs players
Chicago Cubs players
Huntsville Stars players
Nashville Sounds players
Somerset Patriots players